Omothymus is a genus of spiders in the family Theraphosidae, found in Malaysia, Indonesia and Singapore.

Description 
This genus can be distinguished from others thanks to their reproductive organs. They can be distinguished from Phormingochilus by the pointed apex of the embolus. They can also be distinguished by the length of leg 1 and 4, and by their distribution, being found in Malaysia, Singapore and Sumatra, Indonesia.

Species
, the World Spider Catalog accepted the following species:

 Omothymus fuchsi Strand, 1906 - Indonesia
 Omothymus rafni Gabriel & Sherwood, 2019 - Indonesia
 Omothymus schioedtei Thorell, 1891 (type species) - Malaysia
 Omothymus violaceopes Abraham, 1924 - Malaysia and Singapore

In synonymy 
Omothymus thorelli Simon, 1901 = Omothymus schioedtei Thorell, 1891

References

Theraphosidae
Theraphosidae genera
Spiders of Asia